The Clostridiales-2 RNA motif is a conserved RNA structure that was discovered by bioinformatics.
Clostridiales-2 motifs are found in Clostridiales.
Clostridiales-2 RNAs likely function in trans as sRNAs, and are often (but not always) preceded and also followed by Rho-independent transcription terminators.

References

Non-coding RNA